Indian National Basketball Championship for Men is a professional basketball tournament in India for men. This tournament is held by the Basketball Federation of India. The teams in the 61st Championship (2011) listed below with 27 states teams participating.

Teams
The participating teams are:

Upper Pool
 Andhra Pradesh
 Chandigarh
 Chhattisgarh
 Railways
 Karnataka
 Kerala
 Punjab
 Services
 Tamil Nadu
 Uttarakhand

Lower Pool
 Assam
 Bihar
 Delhi
 Gujarat
 Haryana
 Himachal Pradesh
 Jammu and Kashmir
 Jharkhand
 Madhya Pradesh
 Maharashtra
 Mizoram
 Odisha
 Puducherry
 Rajasthan
 Tripura
 Uttar Pradesh
 West Bengal

References

External links
Events and Recruitment (Basketball federation of India site)

Basketball competitions in India